Vigintas Stankus is an artist who is mainly famous as an oil painter. Stankus was born on July 14, 1962, in Kaunas, Lithuania. 1991 graduated from Lithuania Academy of Arts. Vigintas is a member of Lithuanian Artists' Association since 1999. Participant of exhibitions since 1991. Works in sphere of painting.
Vigintas Stankus made more than 60 personal and group exhibitions in Lithuania and abroad (Germany, USA, Spain, Norway, Netherlands etc.)

Creative work credo 
Positive thoughts and emotions reflect in each work, also in painting. Admires Japanese painting. Big influence of east philosophy.

References

External links

Original oil painting "Composition" by Vigintas Stankus 1994 
Some oil paintings
One of the exhibitions
One of the exhibitions

1962 births
Artists from Kaunas
Lithuanian painters
Living people